Rangia is a city and a municipal board in Kamrup rural district in the Indian state of Assam. It is the regional divisional headquarters of the Northeast Frontier Railway. It is situated 52 kilometres away from the state headquarters Dispur Guwahati and 39 kilometres from Jalukbari.

Etymology
The word Rangia has been derived from "Randiya" ("Ran" means 'war' and "Diya" means 'to give') i.e. a place where war happened between Boros and Bhutanese.

History
In Ancient times it was part of Ancient Kamrup, and subsequently included in Kamapitha division of Kamarupa Kingdom. In modern times, Rangiya is part of Kamrupi cultural region.

Geography
It has an average elevation of 39 metres (128 feet). The river Borolia flows through the heart of the city.

Demographics
 India census, Rangiya had a population of 26,389. Males constitute 54% of the population and females 46%. Rangiya has an average literacy rate of 73%, higher than the national average of 59.5%: male literacy is 78%, and female literacy is 67%. In Rangiya, 12% of the population is under six years of age.

Education
There are several educational institutes in Rangiya. Some of them are Jawaharlal Nehru Shishu Vidyalaya (Estd. 1964), Modern English School (Estd. 1993), Third Eye Computer Education Centre (Estd. 2008), Sankardev Academy Junior college, Pragmetic Academy Junior College, Euclid Group of institutions, Faculty Academy, Symbiosis Academy, Rangia College (Estd.1964), Manabendra Sarma Girls College, Rangiya Arabic College, Rangiya Teachers Training College, Rangia Higher Secondary School (Estd. 1936), Rangiya Girls' H.S. School, Rangiya High Madrasa & H.S. School, Arimatta Vidyapith H.S. School, Rangia Hindi High School, Railway High School (Bengali Medium), (Estd.1950), Shankardev Shishu Niketan (Estd. 1987), Ambedkar Lotus English School (Estd. 1984), Fatima Convent School (Estd. 2007), Kendriya Vidyalaya NFR Rangia, SERS Public School, Jawahar Navodaya Vidyalaya, Rangiya Law College and Sankaracharya Vidya Niketan, premada sivanath vidyapith, Red Horns Public School (Estd.1988), Rangia Jatiya Vidyalaya Tiniali (Estd.2010). Rangia Basic training center,The level of educational awareness in this area is high.

Healthcare system
There are several private hospitals in Rangiya apart from 2 government hospitals. Some of them are Swasti Hospital (Estd. 2018), Rangia Poly Clinic & Nursing Home, Sparsh Hospital (Estd. 2016),.

Transport
National Highway 27 runs through the heart of the town.
Rangiya is important transit point in the region, nearly all trains halts at Rangiya Junction railway station. It is a junction of the New Bongaigaon–Guwahati section of Barauni–Guwahati line. It is one of the divisional headquarters of Northeast Frontier Railway. The Rangiya–Murkongselek line connects the state to Arunachal Pradesh.

Note

References

Cities and towns in Kamrup district